Giacomo Benedettini (born 7 October 1982) is a former Sammarinese footballer who played for S.P. Tre Fiori and the San Marino national football team.

External links

1982 births
Living people
Sammarinese footballers
San Marino international footballers
S.P. Tre Fiori players
Association football defenders